ULTRAY2000 is a concept chip for 3D graphics processing designed by Digital Media Professionals Inc. (DMP), a Japanese GPU design company. It was used for real-time 3D graphics. It was produced in 0.13µm TSMC manufacturing process and contained more than 100 million CMOS transistors, with GPU core clock running at 200MHz and its integrated memory controller having support for DDR-400 memory. DMP announced ULTRAY2000 concept chip July 21, 2005, and its first exhibition was at SIGGRAPH 2005. First sample shipments were scheduled for fall of 2005. ULTRAY2000 adopted design where a fixed graphics pipeline architecture coexists with advanced instruction programmable core. 

ULTRAY2000 features proprietary modeled algorithms for generating physical light reflection and shadow properties for various materials which are embedded on the visual processor chip as hardware specific feature (“MAESTRO” technology). This feature gave chip ability for processing real-life looking 3D graphics at high-resolution in real time.

Specification 
SIGGRAPH 2005's public exhibition card:
 Core clock 200MHz produced in 130nm TSMC process 
 256MB DDR-400 SDRAM on 256-bit memory bus - 12.8GB/s memory bandwidth
 PCI interface bus supporting both 64-bit/66MHz and 32-bit/33MHz cards
 display outputs support with digital DVI-I and RGB analog Dsub-15 8DE-15/HD-15) connectors - only one display could be connected to output
 support for OpenGL 2.0, OpenGL ES 2.0 and Java Mobile 3D Graphics for J2ME (JSR-000184) APIs - Mobile 3D Graphics for J2ME is more widely known as M3G 1.0/1.1 since 2007

NOTE: Exhibited part has not supported PCI Express bus because of high licensing fees and projects main business plan were focused on embedded platforms.

DMP “MAESTRO” and “MAESTRO-2G” Technology

“MAESTRO” Technology
“MAESTRO” is sophisticated technology developed by modeling various computer graphics algorithms for later hardware implementation on proprietary solutions, so that can be built on silicon as advanced graphics solutions based on customer demands.

“MAESTRO” technology features:
Shading Maestro (previously known as Material Maestro) - bidirectional reflectance distribution function (BRDF), subsurface scattering (SSS), which enable fast eye-candy rendering with various combination of light reflection modeling to run at a higher resolution
Figure Maestro - figure processing technology that executes within the primitive processing, it includes geometry processing (Geometry Shader --"Geo Shader") and generating polygon subdivision (aka. Tessellation)
Shadow Maestro - shadow rendering enhancement which combine innovative shadow map generation method and shadow filtering process in generating shadow that applies to the final display space, and thus enable creation of beautiful partial soft-edged shadows and self shadows.
Particle Maestro - providing support for high-quality rendering of fuzzy objects which needs specific particle projection, quickly drawing gaseous form objects and beautifully renders clouds, smoke, gas and other fuzzy objects
Glare Maestro - hardware support for rendering lens flare and glare textures

“MAESTRO-2G” Technology
“MAESTRO-2G” technology is further refinement on previous “MAESTRO” generation focused on ability to render images at even higher resolutions by reducing processing contents size and memory bandwidth usage, and thus contributing to reducing energy consumption at the system level.

“MAESTRO-2G” technology additionally features:
Mapping Maestro - rendering algorithms for embedded graphics systems based on the texture mapping (specifically bump mapping, cube mapping, multitexturing etc.) and procedural texturing reduce contents size and memory bandwidth requirements an by that improves overall application performance.
and removes any notion about previously supported Glare Maestro feature.

References

External links 

Graphics hardware
Graphics processing units